Madeleine Scrève (28 August 1912 – 27 March 2006) was a Belgian fencer. She competed in the women's individual foil event at the 1936 Summer Olympics.

References

External links
 

1912 births
2006 deaths
Belgian female foil fencers
Olympic fencers of Belgium
Fencers at the 1936 Summer Olympics